In 1745 Louis Pierre Ancillon de la Sablonnière established the Pechelbronn bitumen mine at Merkwiller-Pechelbronn, Bas-Rhin, Alsace.

He was an interpreter with the French ambassador to Switzerland, then the General Treasurer of the Ligues Suisses and Grisons.

He learned of Jean Theophile Hoeffel's 1734 thesis "Historia Balsami Mineralis Alsatici sev Petrolei Vallis Sancti Lamperti", which described bitumen springs near Lampertsloch. The farm was later called BächelBrunn/Baechel-Brunn for a "source of a brook" or "Baechelbronner" in 1768 when purchased by the LeBel family.

Along with Jean d’Amascéne Eyrénis, the son of physician Eyrini d'Eyrinis, the developer of the La Presta asphalt mine of Val de Travers, Neuchâtel, Switzerland, he obtained permission to start searches around the spring. He created the first oil company in 1740, putting 40 shares on the market.

References

Further reading
 Am Beginn des Erdölzeitalters 
 Otto, C.J. and Toth, J. Hydrogeological controls and indicators for oil deposits in rift grabens - An example from the Upper Rhine graben, France (abstract)
 Scheld, Alfred: Erdöl im Elsass — Die Anfänge der Ölquellen von Pechelbronn, Ubstadt 2012

1745 in France
Asphalt
French businesspeople
Petroleum products
18th-century French people
Year of death missing